Partizánske (meaning “partisan town” formerly: Baťovany) is a town in Trenčín Region, Slovakia.

Geography

History
Partizánske is a relatively young town. Its history starts in 1938–1939, when Jan Antonín Baťa of Zlín and his powerful network of companies built a shoe factory in the cadastral area of Šimonovany municipality. The newly created settlement for workers carried the name of Baťovany and was part of Šimonovany. With the growth of the factory, so grew the settlement. The whole municipality was renamed to Baťovany in 1948 and given town status. As a sign of recognition of local inhabitants fighting in the Slovak National Uprising, the town was renamed Partizánske on 9 February 1949.
The factory was renamed by communists to Závody 29. augusta (29 August works) and it produced 30 million pairs of shoes and employed around 10,000 people. However, after a failed privatisation in the 1990s, only a fraction is left now.

Demographics
According to the 2001 census, the town had 24,907 inhabitants. 97.71% of inhabitants were Slovaks, 0.69% Czechs and 0.35% Roma. The religious makeup was 73.88% Roman Catholics, 18.07% people with no religious affiliation, and 2.95% Lutherans.

Notable natives and residents
Miroslav, Jaroslav, Peter and Pavol Dvorský, four brothers who are all successful opera singers

Twin towns – sister cities

Partizánske is twinned with:

 Bajina Bašta, Serbia
 Benešov, Czech Republic
 Krapkowice, Poland
 Náchod, Czech Republic
 Svit, Slovakia
 Valašské Meziříčí, Czech Republic
 Vukovar, Croatia

Gallery

See also
Svit - another Slovak town founded by the Bata Shoes company.
List of company towns

References

External links
 
 
 Website of town Partizánske

Planned cities
Cities and towns in Slovakia
Villages and municipalities in Partizánske District
Bata Corporation
New towns started in the 1930s